Güllü is a 1972 Turkish comedy film directed by Atıf Yılmaz.

Cast 
 Türkan Şoray - Güllü / Gül
 Ediz Hun - Fikret / Ahmet
 Süleyman Turan - Faruk
 Hulusi Kentmen - Naci

References

External links 

1972 comedy films
1972 films
Turkish comedy films
1970s Turkish-language films